Jeh, a.k.a. Jahi is the Zoroastrian demoness of lust.

Jeh or JEH may also refer to:

 Jeh Airport, in South Pacific
 Jeh language, spoken in Laos and Vietnam
 Tata Jeh automobile, a.k.a. Tata Nano
 The Journal of Economic History, an academic journal

People
Jackie Earle Haley (born 1961), American actor
J. Edgar Hoover (1895–1972), first Director of the Federal Bureau of Investigation (FBI) of the United States
Jeh Johnson (born 1957), American trial lawyer and secretary of the United States Department of Homeland Security